In the mortgage industry of the United States, A-paper is a term to describe a mortgage loan for which the asset and borrower meet the following criteria:

 In the United States, the borrower has a credit score of 680 or higher
 The borrower fully documents their income and assets
 The borrower's debt to income ratio does not exceed 35%
 The borrower retains 2 months of mortgage payments in reserves after closing
 The borrower injects at least 20% equity

See also
 Alt-A paper
 Subprime lending

Mortgage industry of the United States
United States housing bubble
Real estate terminology